Mister Cory is a 1957 American CinemaScope film noir directed by Blake Edwards and starring Tony Curtis, Martha Hyer, Charles Bickford and Kathryn Grant.

Plot
Cory, a poor Chicago kid with a penchant for gambling, gets a job at a posh Wisconsin resort as a busboy. He takes a liking to glamorous socialite Abby Vollard, who is toying with the affections of rich boyfriend Alex Wyncott.

Sabotaging her motorboat as a ploy to get close to her, Cory swims out to help, only to find Abby's kid sister Jen on the boat instead. She volunteers to assist his effort to win Abby's heart.

Abby mistakenly believes him to be a guest at the resort. She invites him on a trip to New York, but when Cory tries to raise money at a poker game, a guest named Caldwell cleans him out. Abby is offended when she discovers that Cory's only a busboy and walks away for good.

A year later, now in Reno trying to change his luck, Cory crosses paths again with Caldwell, only he turns out to actually be a professional gambler known as Biloxi. An ulcer prevents him from playing, so Caldwell partners with Cory, making him his proxy at the table.

Together they return to Chicago when gangster Ruby offers them a chance to run an illegal casino. Cory sends an invitation to the grand opening to Abby, then slips away with her after fixing it so her fiance Alex can gamble and win. They begin a secret affair.

Cory's behavior grows cruel and calculating, more so after he proposes to Abby and is coldly turned down. Biloxi is disgusted with him and breaks their partnership. Alex, who is now losing heavily at the tables, becomes aware that Abby is carrying on with Cory behind his back. He tips off the cops, who raid Ruby's gambling house. Cory tries to flee, but Alex shoots him in the arm.

Ashamed of his behavior, Cory declines to prosecute. He goes to the airport, where an older and more beautiful Jen unexpectedly shows up and offers to come along.

Cast
 Tony Curtis as Cory
 Martha Hyer as Abby Vollard 
 Charles Bickford as Jeremiah Des Plains 'Biloxi' Caldwell
 Kathryn Grant as Jen Vollard
 William Reynolds as Alex Wyncott
 Henry Daniell as Mr. Earmshaw
 Russ Morgan as Ruby Matrobe
 Willis Bouchey as Mr. Vollard 
 Louise Lorimer as Mrs. Vollard 
 Joan Banks as Lily
 Harry Landers as Andy
 Glen Kramer as Ronnie Chambers
 Dick Crockett as The cook

Background
The film was based on a novella titled "Cory" by Leo Rosten, published in Cosmopolitan (1948), under the pseudonym Leonard Q. Ross. In mid-September 1955, Curtleigh Productions acquired the filming rights to Leo Rosten's short. Curtis, who was planning to star in the picture, immediately assigned Edwards to develop the screenplay and offered the job of directing it to British director Carol Reed, with whom he was filming Trapeze in France.

A radio drama version of "Cory" was broadcast on August 28, 1949 as an episode of Four Star Playhouse, starring Fred MacMurray in the title role.

See also
 List of American films of 1957

References

External links 
 
 

1957 drama films
1957 films
American drama films
Curtleigh Productions films
Films directed by Blake Edwards
Films scored by Henry Mancini
Films set in Wisconsin
Films with screenplays by Blake Edwards
Universal Pictures films
CinemaScope films
1950s English-language films
1950s American films